This list covers formal bank stress testing programs, as implemented by major regulators worldwide. It does not cover bank proprietary, internal testing programs.

A bank stress tests is an analysis of a bank's ability to endure a hypothetical adverse economic scenario. 
Stress tests became widely used after the 2008 financial crisis.

Example
For example, in the U.S. in 2012, an adverse scenario used in stress testing was all of the following:
 Unemployment at 13 percent
 50 percent drop in equity prices
 21 percent decline in housing prices.

Asia
 Monetary Authority of Singapore
 Annual Industry-Wide Stress Testing exercise (usually around Q1)
 International Monetary Fund
 2011 and 2012 stress testing of Japan banks, Financial System Stability Assessment Update (FSAP)
 China Banking Regulatory Commission
 2011 CARPLES risk indicators framework
 Australian Prudential Regulation Authority
 2014 industry stress test
 Reserve Bank of New Zealand
 2014 major bank stress test

Europe
 Financial Services Authority (UK)
 2008 Stress and scenario testing CP08/24
 2009 Stress and Scenario Testing Feedback on CP08/24
 Bank of England
 Annual industry stress test
 European Banking Authority (euro area)
 2009 European Union bank stress test
 2010 European Union bank stress test
 2011 European Union bank stress test
 2014 European Union bank stress test
 The stress test was part of the Comprehensive Assessment by the European Central Bank.
 2016 European Union bank stress test (scenario release: Wednesday 24 February 2016)
 2018 European Union bank stress test (scenario release: Likely end February 2018 " final methodology will be published as the exercise is launched, at the beginning of 2018,")

Americas
 Federal Reserve System
  2009 Supervisory Capital Assessment Program (SCAP)
 Note: there was no 2010 stress test in the USA
 Comprehensive Capital Analysis and Review (CCAR)
 2011
 2012
 2013
 A private conference call was held with banks to notify them of a new, two part information release by the Fed [Dow Jones]
March 7, 2013 – Banks will be privately notified of the Fed's tentative decision on capital distribution plans.
 Banks receiving a "no" will then have a 48 hours to privately resubmit to the Fed a reduced a distribution plan.
March 14, 2013 – the Fed will publicly disclose final decisions on requests for capital distributions
The week of private negotiations between the bank and the Fed will allow banks to adjust their request downward to what the Fed will allow. This was specifically designed to allow banks to avoid "embarrassing capital-plan rejections"
Shareholder lawsuits are expected if banks fail to disclose capital distribution plans and Fed rejections (even if labeled "informal") as the majority of shareholders and prospective shareholders regard bank dividend and share buyback plans, and limits, to be extremely material information.
Banks may not follow Fed advice and release capital distribution plans in advance of March 14. [Bloomberg]
 2014
 2015
 2016
 2017
 2018
Dodd-Frank Act Stress Tests
 2013-2018
 Central Bank of Brazil (Portuguese: Banco Central do Brasil)

See also

 Bank regulation
 Basel III
 Stress test (financial)
 Systemically important financial institution
 List of systemically important banks

References

Further reading 

 Bank stress test at Investopedia.

Stress tests (financial)
Market risk
Banking-related lists